Registered may refer to:
 Registered mail, letters, packets or other postal documents considered valuable and in need of a chain of custody
 Registered trademark symbol, symbol ® that provides notice that the preceding is a trademark or service mark.

See also
 
Register (disambiguation)
Registered memory, a type of computer memory